The Escalera de los Moros (Moors ladder) is a medieval-Islamic public building works aimed at a Dam or wetland located on the promenade of the Oron river outside the village of Librilla, Murcia, Spain.

Description 
Served a lowering of water from a stream to Weir of the promenade with a phased revosadero explains the place name by which he is known. Made in ashlar masonry typical of Arabic is a curious construction of hydraulic works in made in the Islamic period. Given the difficult access its state of preservation is excellent and is quite unknown to the researchers, although of great importance for the study of Islamic irrigation in the area.

External links 
 https://web.archive.org/web/20110725194848/http://contraclave.org/historia/CONGRESO%20IDENTIDAD/comunicaciones/Fernando%20Barquero%20patrimonio.pdf

Buildings and structures in the Region of Murcia